Bahadorabad or Bahador Abad may refer to:
 Bahadorabad, Fars
 Bahadorabad, Sistan and Baluchestan